Adrian Wong may refer to:

 Adrian Wong (artist) (born 1980), American artist
 Adrian Wong (basketball) (born 1996), Filipino-American basketball player
 Adrian Wong Tsz-ching (born 1990), Hong Kong actress